is the fourth studio album by Japanese model-singer Kyary Pamyu Pamyu, released on September 26, 2018, by Warner Music Japan sublabel Unborde. The album debuted at number 12 of the Oricon Weekly Albums chart, selling 10,407 copies on its first week of release as well as at number seven of the Oricon Weekly Digital Albums chart with 876 downloads.

Track listing

Charts

References

Kyary Pamyu Pamyu albums
2018 albums
Japanese-language albums
Warner Music Japan albums
Unborde albums
Albums produced by Yasutaka Nakata
Synth-pop albums by Japanese artists
Electronic albums by Japanese artists